Grażyna Oliszewska (born 22 October 1959) is a Polish sprinter. She competed in the women's 400 metres at the 1980 Summer Olympics.

References

External links
 

1959 births
Living people
Athletes (track and field) at the 1980 Summer Olympics
Polish female sprinters
Olympic athletes of Poland
Place of birth missing (living people)
Olympic female sprinters